Marion Township is one of twelve townships in Buchanan County, Missouri, USA.  As of the 2010 census, its population was 1,178.

Marion Township was established in 1837.

Geography
It contains eight cemeteries: Blakely, Bowen, Courtney, Kessler, Minor, Moxley, Saint Josephs and Saint Marys.

The streams of Becks Branch, James Branch, Little Third Fork, Muddy Creek, One Hundred and Two River and Third Fork run through this township.

References

External links
 US-Counties.com
 City-Data.com
 USGS Geographic Names Information System (GNIS)

Townships in Buchanan County, Missouri
Townships in Missouri